Juan de Freitas (born 13 December 1989) is a Uruguayan rugby union player. He was named in Uruguay's squad for the 2015 Rugby World Cup.

Honours
Uruguay U20
World Rugby Under 20 Trophy: 2008

References

1989 births
Living people
Uruguayan rugby union players
Uruguay international rugby union players
Place of birth missing (living people)
Rugby union flankers